The Ludwig Order, was an order of the Grand Duchy of Hesse which was awarded to meritorious soldiers and civilians from 1807 to 1918.

History
The order was founded by Louis I, Grand Duke of Hesse and by Rhine as an order of merit without name or statute on 25 August 1807. On 14 December 1831 statutes were adopted for the order, giving it its formal name, dividing it into five classes, and setting the terms for award. It was to be awarded to meritorious soldiers and civilians "von den obersten Stufe bis auf die unterste" (from the highest level to the lowest).

The order became obsolete with the abdication of the last Grand Duke of Hesse in November 1918.

Classes 
The order was divided into five classes:
 Grand Cross
 Commander 1st Class
 Commander 2nd Class
 Knight 1st Class
 Knight 2nd Class

Grand Crosses

 Abbas II of Egypt
 Prince Adalbert of Prussia (1811–1873)
 Prince Adalbert of Prussia (1884–1948)
 Vladimir Fyodorovich Adlerberg
 Adolphe, Grand Duke of Luxembourg
 Adolphus Frederick V, Grand Duke of Mecklenburg-Strelitz
 Prince Albert of Prussia (1809–1872)
 Albert of Saxony
 Archduke Albrecht, Duke of Teschen
 Prince Albert of Prussia (1837–1906)
 Albrecht, Duke of Württemberg
 Alexander II of Russia
 Alexander III of Russia
 Alexander of Battenberg
 Prince Alexander of Hesse and by Rhine
 Prince Alexander of Prussia
 Grand Duke Alexei Alexandrovich of Russia
 Prince Alfons of Bavaria
 Alfred, Duke of Saxe-Coburg and Gotha
 Prince Arnulf of Bavaria
 Friedrich von Beck-Rzikowsky
 Prince Arthur of Connaught
 Prince Arthur, Duke of Connaught and Strathearn
 Bernhard II, Duke of Saxe-Meiningen
 Bernhard III, Duke of Saxe-Meiningen
 Prince Bernhard of Saxe-Weimar-Eisenach (1792–1862)
 Theobald von Bethmann Hollweg
 Otto von Bismarck
 Jérôme Bonaparte
 Walther Bronsart von Schellendorff
 Bernhard von Bülow
 Saturnino Calderón Collantes
 Carl, 3rd Prince of Leiningen
 Carol I of Romania
 Charles I of Württemberg
 Charles II, Duke of Brunswick
 Charles III, Prince of Monaco
 Charles Alexander, Grand Duke of Saxe-Weimar-Eisenach
 Charles Augustus, Hereditary Grand Duke of Saxe-Weimar-Eisenach (1844–1894)
 Prince Charles of Hesse and by Rhine
 Prince Charles of Prussia
 Chlodwig, Landgrave of Hesse-Philippsthal-Barchfeld
 Christian IX of Denmark
 Prince Christian of Schleswig-Holstein
 Edward VII
 Prince Edward of Saxe-Weimar
 Duke Elimar of Oldenburg
 Ernest Louis, Grand Duke of Hesse
 Ernst Leopold, 4th Prince of Leiningen
 Archduke Eugen of Austria
 Ferdinand I of Austria
 Ferdinand, Landgrave of Hesse-Homburg
 Francis V, Duke of Modena
 Francisco de Asís, Duke of Cádiz
 Franz Joseph I of Austria
 Archduke Franz Karl of Austria
 Frederick II, Grand Duke of Baden
 Frederick VIII of Denmark
 Frederick Augustus II, Grand Duke of Oldenburg
 Frederick Francis II, Grand Duke of Mecklenburg-Schwerin
 Frederick Francis III, Grand Duke of Mecklenburg-Schwerin
 Frederick Francis IV, Grand Duke of Mecklenburg-Schwerin
 Frederick I, Duke of Anhalt
 Frederick I, Grand Duke of Baden
 Frederick III, German Emperor
 Prince Frederick of Prussia (1794–1863)
 Frederick William III of Prussia
 Frederick William IV of Prussia
 Frederick William, Elector of Hesse
 Frederick William, Grand Duke of Mecklenburg-Strelitz
 Prince Friedrich Karl of Prussia (1828–1885)
 Prince Friedrich Leopold of Prussia
 Georg Donatus, Hereditary Grand Duke of Hesse
 George I of Greece
 George Albert, Prince of Schwarzburg-Rudolstadt
 Prince George of Prussia
 George, King of Saxony
 Alexander Gorchakov
 Gustaf V
 Gustav, Prince of Vasa
 Gustav, Landgrave of Hesse-Homburg
 Wilhelm von Hahnke
 Prince Henry of Prussia (1862–1929)
 Heinrich VII, Prince Reuss of Köstritz
 Prince Hermann of Saxe-Weimar-Eisenach (1825–1901)
 Karl Eberhard Herwarth von Bittenfeld
 Oskar von Hutier
 Prince Joachim of Prussia
 Archduke John of Austria
 John of Saxony
 Duke John Albert of Mecklenburg
 Archduke Joseph Karl of Austria
 Karl Anton, Prince of Hohenzollern
 Prince Karl Theodor of Bavaria
 Karl Theodor, Duke in Bavaria
 Hans von Koester
 Grand Duke Konstantin Nikolayevich of Russia
 Konstantin of Hohenlohe-Schillingsfürst
 Leopold I of Belgium
 Leopold II of Belgium
 Prince Leopold, Duke of Albany
 Prince Leopold of Bavaria
 Leopold, Prince of Hohenzollern
 Eugen Maximilianovich, 5th Duke of Leuchtenberg
 Walter von Loë
 Louis III, Grand Duke of Hesse
 Louis IV, Grand Duke of Hesse
 Louis II, Grand Duke of Baden
 Prince Louis of Battenberg
 Ludwig I of Bavaria
 Ludwig II of Bavaria
 Ludwig III of Bavaria
 Archduke Ludwig Viktor of Austria
 Luís I of Portugal
 Luitpold, Prince Regent of Bavaria
 Prince Maximilian of Baden
 Duke Charles of Mecklenburg
 Klemens von Metternich
 Grand Duke Michael Nikolaevich of Russia
 Grand Duke Michael Alexandrovich of Russia
 Milan I of Serbia
 Helmuth von Moltke the Elder
 Napoleon III
 Nicholas I of Russia
 Nicholas II of Russia
 Nicholas Alexandrovich, Tsesarevich of Russia
 Grand Duke Nicholas Konstantinovich of Russia
 Grand Duke Nicholas Nikolaevich of Russia (1831–1891)
 Prince Nikolaus Wilhelm of Nassau
 Oscar II
 Archduke Otto of Austria (1865–1906)
 Otto of Bavaria
 Otto of Greece
 Duke Paul Frederick of Mecklenburg
 Peter II, Grand Duke of Oldenburg
 Duke Peter of Oldenburg
 Prince Philipp of Saxe-Coburg and Gotha
 Hans von Plessen
 Prince Frederick William of Hesse-Kassel
 Joseph Radetzky von Radetz
 Archduke Rainer Ferdinand of Austria
 Prince Rudolf of Liechtenstein
 Rudolf, Crown Prince of Austria
 Rupprecht, Crown Prince of Bavaria
 Princess Mafalda of Savoy
 Alfred von Schlieffen
 Infante Sebastian of Portugal and Spain
 Grand Duke Sergei Alexandrovich of Russia
 Archduke Stephen of Austria (Palatine of Hungary)
 Ludwig Freiherr von und zu der Tann-Rathsamhausen
 Francis, Duke of Teck
 Julius von Verdy du Vernois
 Princess Victoria Melita of Saxe-Coburg and Gotha
 Grand Duke Vladimir Alexandrovich of Russia
 Illarion Vorontsov-Dashkov
 Prince Waldemar of Prussia (1889–1945)
 Alfred von Waldersee
 Wilhelm II, German Emperor
 Prince Wilhelm of Prussia (1783–1851)
 Wilhelm, Duke of Urach
 William I of Württemberg
 William I, German Emperor
 William II, Elector of Hesse
 William III of the Netherlands
 William Ernest, Grand Duke of Saxe-Weimar-Eisenach
 Prince William of Baden (1829–1897)
 Prince William of Hesse-Philippsthal-Barchfeld
 William, Duke of Brunswick
 William, Prince of Hohenzollern
 Maximilian von Wimpffen
 Duke Eugen of Württemberg (1846–1877)

Commanders 1st Class

 Rudolf von Delbrück
 Joseph von Radowitz

Commanders 2nd Class

 Count Nikolay Adlerberg
 Antoni Wilhelm Radziwiłł

Other Classes

 Bar, Johann Baptist von
 Felix Graf von Bothmer
 Johann Dzierzon
 Prince Franz of Bavaria
 Ivan Fullon
 Alexander Gorchakov
 Benedict Samuel Levi
 Maximilian Karl Lamoral O'Donnell
 Karl Schlösser

References
 

Orders of chivalry of Germany
Orders, decorations, and medals of Hesse
1807 establishments in the Grand Duchy of Hesse
Awards established in 1807
1807 establishments in Germany